William Bland may refer to:

William Bland (1789–1868), English physician sent as a convict to Australia
William Bland (politician) (died 1945), British politician and trade unionist
William Harry Bland (1898–1962), World War I flying ace
William Thomas Bland (1861–1928), U.S. Representative from Missouri
Billy Bland (1932–2017), American singer/songwriter
Billy Bland (runner) (born 1947), British fell runner
Bill Bland (1916–2001), British Hoxhaist
Spike Bland (William Bland, fl. 1941), American baseball player